Empty Hearts is a 1924 American silent drama film directed by Alfred Santell. Adele Buffington wrote the scenario based on Evelyn Campbell's story published in Metropolitan.

Plot
Milt Kimberlin marries a cabaret dancer who dies after he loses his money. Years later, he regains his fortune and remarries, but he's distant and misses his first wife. His new wife leaves him after a blackmailer's letter arrives suggesting infidelity in his first marriage, but eventually the truth is revealed and their relationship grows stronger.

Cast
 John Bowers as Milt Kimberlin
 Charles Murray as Joe Delane
 John Miljan as Frank Gorman
 Clara Bow as Rosalie
 Buck Black as Val Kimberlin
 Lillian Rich as Madeline
 Joan Standing as Hilda, the maid

Preservation
An incomplete print of Empty Hearts is held by the UCLA Film and Television Archive.

References

External links

1924 films
American silent feature films
American black-and-white films
Films directed by Alfred Santell
1924 drama films
Silent American drama films
1920s American films
1920s English-language films